Kejora dan Bintang (Kejora and Bintang) is an Indonesian TV serial that was aired on RCTI. It was produced video productions house public distributor company network by SinemArt directed by Erlanda Gunawan.

Cast
 Alyssa Soebandono as Kejora
 Rachel Amanda as Bintang
 Baim Wong as Erlangga
 Lucky Perdana as Fitra
 Eva Anindhita as Janet
 Mathias Muchus as Ryan
 Cut Keke as Hanifah
 Mieke Wijaya as Gautama
 Adipati Dolken as Anantha
 Lia Kartika as Kartika
 Ana Pinem as Minah
 Rio Reifan as Joel
 Mayang Yuditia as Lenna
 Vonny Cornelia as Sukma
 Atiq Rachman as Rahman
 Liza Mayang as Anita
 Adipati Koesmadji

Synopsis
Kejora (Alyssa Soebandono) is a 19-year-old girl who has everything. She is pretty, cheerful, optimistic, and rich. She went to school in Japan. Mr Ryan (Mathias Muchus), her father, is a well-known businessman in Jakarta. Her mother has died. Kejora has a younger sister named Bintang (Amanda) (15 years) who has autism. However, Bintang is very good at playing the piano. Ryan is then remarried to Hanifa (Cut Keke), a widow with one child named Janet (Eva Anindita).
One day, while Kejora is flying back to Jakarta, her suitcase gets switched up with Erlangga's (Baim Wong), the grandson of Gautama (Mieke Wijaya), a rich, yet a very stubborn and needy woman. What Kejora doesn't know is that Erlangga is in fact the boyfriend of Janet, her stepsister.

Mr. Ryan on the other hand is facing a huge financial crisis in his company. He always hides the fact that he is facing bankruptcy from his daughters.
Secretly, Kejora has a boyfriend named Joel (Rio Reifan), who is very materialistic. Joel has a brother named Fitra (Lucky Perdana) who admires Kejora.

One day, when going to get a loan, Ryan was robbed. During the robbery, an accident happens and one of the robberies is killed on the fire. Ryan then gets an idea that if he pretended to be killed in this accident, his family will get a huge insurance settlement and be out of this financial crisis. He pretends to be killed. Kejora was devastated by the news. After Ryan's death, Kejora's relationship with Hanifa is becoming very tense. Until one day Hanifa throws Kejora and Bintang out of their father's house.

External links
 Kejora dan Bintang

Indonesian television series